Badminton at the 2014 Asian Para Games was held at the Gyeyang Gymnasium in Incheon, South Korea from October 19 to 23, 2014.

Medal table

Medalists

Men

Women

Mixed

See also
 Badminton at the 2014 Asian Games

References

External links
 incheon2014apg.org

2014 Asian Para Games events
Badminton at the Asian Para Games